Larysa Mykolayivna Bilozir (née Kucher; born 24 September 1981) is a Ukrainian politician currently serving as a People's Deputy of Ukraine representing Ukraine's 15th electoral district as an independent member of Dovira since 2019.

Biography 
Larysa Mykolayivna Kucher was born on 24 September 1981, in the family of agronomist Mykola Kucher and a librarian in the village of Trostianets, Vinnytsia Oblast, where she spent her childhood and went to school.

After graduating from school, she entered the Institute of International Relations of the Taras Shevchenko National University of Kyiv, where she received a degree in economics and, over time, the degree of Candidate of Economic Sciences. After that she continued her studies at the International Institute of Management in Brussels and received a master's degree in business administration.

Since 2004, Bilozir has worked in the structures of the agro-industrial complex, private business, and the social sphere.

Political career 
In 2015 she was elected a deputy of the Vinnytsia Regional Council from the Petro Poroshenko Bloc party, and was the head of the Charitable Foundation for Aid to Children with Cancer. Heads the public organization "Life and Development of Communities".

In 2019, Bilozir was elected a People's Deputy of Ukraine in Ukraine's 15th electoral district (Murovanokurilovetsky, Tomashpilsky, Tulchynsky, Chernivtsi, Shargorod districts) as a self-nominated candidate. At the time of the election: Executive Director of the NGO "Life and Development of Communities", non-partisan. Lives in Kyiv.

Family 
Bilozir's father is Mykola Kucher, a Ukrainian politician and former Soviet party functionary currently serving as a People's Deputy of Ukraine. Her husband is Andriy Bilozir, the son of composer Ihor Bilozor and singer Oksana Bilozir. She has two daughters.

References 

1981 births
Living people
Ninth convocation members of the Verkhovna Rada
21st-century Ukrainian politicians
21st-century Ukrainian women politicians
Independent politicians in Ukraine
Laureates of the Honorary Diploma of the Verkhovna Rada of Ukraine
People from Vinnytsia Oblast
Taras Shevchenko National University of Kyiv alumni
Women members of the Verkhovna Rada